The Who Tour 2000 was partially in support of The Who's live album The Blues to the Bush and their first full-fledged tour as a five-piece band since The Who Tour 1982.

History
The group's successful series of shows in late The Who 1999 Performances led them to carry out a much longer series of dates, with three two-week legs in the United States and another 11 shows in the United Kingdom. Both the first and last shows of the year were charity performances, the latter at London's Royal Albert Hall and including special guests. The Royal Albert Hall show was also released on CD and DVD (see "Live Releases" below).

The group began by playing a charity show at the Jacob K. Javits Convention Center in New York City on 6 June, although this was not technically part of the tour. Drummer Zak Starkey was not available for this performance, so Simon Phillips, who had been the drummer on the 1989 tour, sat in. The United States leg officially began on 25 June at the New World Music Theatre in the Chicago suburb of Tinley Park, Illinois and comprised three two-week legs, concluding with the last of four shows at New York City's Madison Square Garden 7 October. The United Kingdom leg began at the National Exhibition Centre in Birmingham on 30 October and ended with a charity performance at the Royal Albert Hall (benefiting the Teenage Cancer Trust) on 27 November.

Although original bassist John Entwistle would play with the band at The Concert for New York City in October 2001 and at a series of dates in England in early The Who Tour 2002, this was his last full-completed tour with the band before his death.

The shows in general were greeted with accolades from both fans and press. Entwistle sang very little vocals compared to before, and apart from lead on My Wife, only sang backing vocals on I Can't Explain and Substitute. Bargain was played in the lower key of A Major rather than the original key of Bb, to suit Daltrey's vocals. Starkey's drumming was now perfectly suited to the band, allowing more loose jamming during songs for the first time since the late 1970s, and Townshend smashed his guitar at the end of the Jones Beach show on July 9, the only occasion this happened on the whole tour.

Live releases
Live material from 2000 has appeared on the following releases:

The show of 27 November was released on CD as Live at the Royal Albert Hall. The set also includes bonus material from John Entwistle's last show with the band on 8 February 2002, also at the Royal Albert Hall.
The 27 November show was also released on DVD as The Who & Special Guests: Live at the Royal Albert Hall, although this release omitted "Getting In Tune" and "Mary Anne with the Shaky Hand".

Tour band
Roger Daltrey – lead vocals, harmonica, occasional acoustic guitar
Pete Townshend – lead guitar, vocals
John Entwistle – bass guitar, vocals
Additional Members
Zak Starkey – drums (except on 6 June)
John Bundrick – piano, keyboards, backing vocals
Simon Phillips – drums (6 June only)

Set list
Set lists were similar to what the group played in 1999, but the band added the Lifehouse songs "The Relay" (last played in 1980) and "I Don't Even Know Myself" (last played in The Who Tour 1971) for these shows. Also played at the beginning of the tour was "The Seeker", which group hadn't done since The Who Tour 1970, but it was dropped after only four performances. Beginning on 9 July, Townshend began performing a solo acoustic spot, either with "Drowned" or "I'm One"; in Cleveland, he opted to play "Sheraton Gibson" (from his 1972 solo album Who Came First), explaining that the song was about the city of Cleveland. Townshend added a coda to "My Generation" during the UK tour which would eventually become the faster section of the John Entwistle tribute "Old Red Wine". The charity show in New York on 6 June had a slightly shorter set list than what was played on the tour itself.

Below is a typical set list for the tour (all songs written by Pete Townshend unless otherwise specified):

"I Can't Explain"
"Substitute"
"Anyway, Anyhow, Anywhere" (Roger Daltrey, Pete Townshend)
"I Don't Even Know Myself" (Not played on 14, 27, and 29 August, 24 September, and 3, 5, and 30 October)
"My Wife" (John Entwistle)
"Baba O'Riley"
"The Seeker" (Dropped after 1 July)
"Drowned" (Added on 9 July)
"Bargain"
"Getting In Tune" (Dropped from 1 July to 22 August)
"The Relay" (Sometimes appeared as the fourth song in the set)
"Pinball Wizard"
"The Real Me"
"Who Are You"
"Magic Bus"
"Behind Blue Eyes"
"You Better You Bet"
"5.15"
"Won't Get Fooled Again"
Encores:
"The Kids Are Alright" (occasionally played in the middle of the set)
"Let's See Action"
"Mary Anne with the Shaky Hand" (UK leg only)
"My Generation"

There were some set list substitutions, variations, and order switches during the tour. Some other songs were played which are not in the above lists:

"I'm One" (performed either with the whole band or as a Townshend solo acoustic performance)
Performed on 29 June; 1, 3, 5 and 7 July; 19, 22 and 24 August; 6 October and 8 November.
"Naked Eye" (occasionally played as an encore)
Performed on 3 July; 21, 22, 24, 25 and 27 August; 24 September and 4 October.
"See Me, Feel Me"
Performed on 3 July.
Medley: "I Walk the Line" (Johnny Cash)/"Ring of Fire" (June Carter, Merle Kilgore)
Performed on 24 August.
"Sheraton Gibson"
Performed on 30 September.
"Dance It Away"
Performed (loosely) on 1 July and 30 September.
"Old Red Wine" (ending riff only)
Performed at the end of "My Generation" during the UK tour.
"A Quick One, While He's Away"
Performed (only the "You Are Forgiven" section) on 16 November.

In light of the special guests, the set list at 27 November charity show at the Royal Albert Hall differed somewhat from the rest of the tour. Townshend chose to play a solo acoustic version of "Heart to Hang Onto" (from his 1977 album with Ronnie Lane, Rough Mix) and followed with the first performance of "So Sad About Us" since 1967, playing with guest Paul Weller. Set list:

"I Can't Explain"
"Anyway, Anyhow, Anywhere"
"Pinball Wizard"
"The Relay"
"My Wife" (John Entwistle)
"The Kids Are Alright"
"Mary Anne with the Shaky Hand"
"Bargain"
"Magic Bus"
"Who Are You"
"Baba O'Riley" (featuring violinist Nigel Kennedy in place of Roger Daltrey's usual harmonica solo)
"Drowned" (Townshend solo acoustic)
"Heart to Hang Onto" (Townshend solo acoustic)
"So Sad About Us" (featuring only Townshend and Paul Weller on both acoustic guitars and vocals)
"I'm One" (featuring Eddie Vedder on vocals)
"Getting In Tune" (featuring Eddie Vedder on vocals)
"Behind Blue Eyes" (featuring Bryan Adams on vocals)
"You Better You Bet"
"The Real Me"
"5.15"
"Won't Get Fooled Again" (featuring Noel Gallagher on lead guitar)
Encores:
"Substitute" (featuring Kelly Jones on electric guitar and vocals)
"Let's See Action" (featuring Eddie Vedder on vocals)
"My Generation"
"See Me, Feel Me"

Tour dates

See also
The Who Tours and Performances

References

2000 concert tours
The Who concert tours
Concert tours of the United States
Concert tours of Europe
Concert tours of North America
Concert tours of the United Kingdom